Urophysa is a genus of flowering plants belonging to the family Ranunculaceae.

Its native range is China.

Species:
 Urophysa henryi (Oliv.) Ulbr. 
 Urophysa rockii Ulbr.

References

Ranunculaceae
Ranunculaceae genera